Veeracholapuram is a village located near Viluppuram in Viluppuram district, Tamil Nadu, India.

Temples
Veeracholapuram is famous for its Shiva Temple and is known as Veeracholapuram Shiva Temple.  Veeracholapuram is also notable for the Brindavana of Satyanatha Tirtha, a Hindu saint and pontiff of Uttaradi Matha of Dvaita Order of Vedanta, who took samadhi in the year 1674 on the bank of river Dakshina Pinakini in this village.

References

Villages in Viluppuram district